No Limits is the sixth studio album by German heavy metal band U.D.O. It was recorded and mixed by Stefan Kaufmann at Roxx Studio in Pulheim. No Limits is the last album to feature guitarist Jürgen Graf.

The album includes a new recording of "I'm a Rebel" from Accept's album I'm a Rebel. "Love Machine" is a cover version of a song by Supermax. "Azrael" was written by the German musician Albert Böhne in connection with a book by German horror writer Wolfgang Hohlbein.

Track listings

Personnel
U.D.O.
Udo Dirkschneider – vocals, producer
Stefan Kaufmann – guitars, backing vocals, producer, engineer, mixing
Jürgen Graf – guitars, backing vocals
Fitty Wienhold – bass, backing vocals
Stefan Schwarzmann – drums

Additional musicians
Mathias Dieth – guitar solo on "One Step to Fate"

Production
Manfred Melchior – mastering
Jan Meininghaus – cover art
Jens Rosendahl – photography
Peter Lohde – design
Tim Eckhorst – design (anniversary edition)

References

1998 albums
U.D.O. albums
GUN Records albums